The Nikon FM3A is an interchangeable-lens, focal-plane shutter, 35 mm film, single-lens reflex (SLR) camera.  It was manufactured by Nikon Corporation in Japan, on small-volume assembly lines, from 2001 to 2006. The camera was available in two colours: all black and satin chrome.  The introductory US list price for the chrome body only (no lens) was $820.

The FM3A was the successor to the renowned Nikon FM2N camera of 1984 and was the last member of the successful, semi-professional line of Nikon compact 35 mm film SLRs.  The other members were the Nikon FM (released 1977), FE (1978), FM2 (1982) and FE2 (1983). They (and the Nikon FA) all used the superficially similar (but not identical) rugged copper-aluminium alloy chassis and high-quality Nikon vertical bearing-mounted metal shutter and ball-bearing mounted film advance, but with improved feature levels, minor external controls and cosmetic differences. The newer low-budget Nikon FM10 and FE10, while named similarly, are completely different introductory-level cameras manufactured by Cosina.

The major improvements in the FM3A compared to the FM2N are the hybrid electro-mechanically controlled aluminium-bladed focal plane shutter, the aperture priority auto-exposure mode, the match-needle exposure control system and provision for through-the-lens (TTL) off-the-film (OTF) electronic flash automation. In other words, the FM3A merged the robust mechanical systems of the FM2N with the proven, reliable electronic exposure controls of the FE2.

Features 
The FM3a is built to a high level of workmanship and material quality.  It shares the advantages of the FM and the FM2N, both generally regarded as two of the most reliable cameras ever built (both in terms of operation under extreme conditions and in day-to-day reliability reports from repair shops and magazine surveys). It has an extremely strong body of copper silumin alloy. The electronics are well protected within the body and of extremely high quality, including the flexible circuits.  The FM3A's film transport consists of high-strength hardened metal gears and moving parts, mounted on clusters of ball bearings. The vertical metal shutter utilises precision tapered high-strength aluminium alloy blades and oilless self-lubricating bearings. The guide rails are made of stainless steel. The mirror is made of titanium. It is large to reduce chances of vignetting with super-telephotos of up to 800 mm, and uses the same mechanism found on Nikon's pro F2, with some improvements designed to further reduce effects of vibration and mirror bounce.

The FM3A accepts all of the Nikkor lenses with the Nikon F bayonet mount that support the Automatic Indexing (AI) feature (AI, AIS), first introduced in 1977.  The chrome FM3A was often sold in a kit that includes a color coordinated chrome finished Nikkor 45 mm f/2.8P lens.  This special flat "pancake" lens was manually focused on the FM3A, but contained a CPU which could communicate focal distance to Nikon's later autofocus (AF) camera bodies.

Other accessories for the FM3A include the Nikon MD-12 motor drive (automatic film advance up to 3.2 frames per second), as well as the Nikon MF-16 databack (sequential numbering, time or date stamping on the film), and the various compatible Nikon TTL flashes (SB-15, SB-16b, SB-20, etc.)

In manual mode, the camera is completely mechanical in operation, and only requires batteries for the light metering information system.  In aperture priority mode, the batteries continued to power the meter, but are also utilized for shutter timing and the exposure control electronics.  The FM3A's metering information system consisted of a match-needle system using two needles pointing along a vertical shutter speed scale on the left side of the viewfinder to indicate the readings of the built-in 60/40% centerweighted silicon photodiode light meter versus the actual camera settings.  This system can be traced back to the Nikkormat EL (Nikomat EL in Japan) of 1972.  The viewfinder also has Nikon's fully interchangeable bright focus screen with various options for focus.

Design history 
During the mid-1990s, a demand arose among some photographers for a quality manual-focus alternative to the 35 mm autofocus SLR camera.  These cameras required complex computer and processing mechanisms, and especially in their amateur and consumer versions, were known for neither their ruggedness nor a long service life. Nikon owners began to demand a durable, precision-made camera with the AE electronic features and prized construction of the discontinued Nikon FE2, which had begun to skyrocket in value on the secondhand market. Nikon responded to this phenomenon with a revival of their classic FM/FE series design.

The FM3A's expensive construction and conservative design were not intended to appeal to the consumer-level market.  Nikon instead marketed the camera to serious amateur and professional photographers who were desirous of the highest possible quality and precision of control, and a service life estimated not in years, but decades.

The FM3A's introduction coincided with a major technological revolution in photographic technology – digital imaging.  Many photographers, professional and amateur alike, switched to digital, resulting in a huge decrease in film SLR sales. By 2004, annual sales of digital cameras had surpassed those of film cameras.  Though FM3A sales remained steady, they were minuscule in volume compared to Nikon's other cameras, and steadily increasing costs forced Nikon to announce the discontinuation of the FM3A on 11 January 2006, leaving only the expensive and heavily electronic Nikon F6 and the inexpensively built Nikon FM10 in Nikon's 35mm film SLR line.  Since the announcement of the FM3A's discontinuance, value on the secondhand market of the FM3A camera (and its FM2 predecessors) appreciably increased, this is especially true of the black model. As of 2014, the price for a Mint or Near Mint FM3A are as high as the new price (around 800 - 900 Euro in 2001). This makes this camera to be one of the most price-stable 35mm SLRs.

References 

 "The Nikon Compendium" by Simon Stafford. Lark Books, 2004. 
 Anonymous.  "Nikon FM2: Fastest Shutter and Sync" pp 77–79.  Modern Photography's Photo Buying Guide '85.  reprint from Modern Photography, September 1982.
 Anonymous.  "Modern Tests: Nikon FE2 Adds Superfast Shutter and Much More" pp 86–92.  Modern Photography, Volume 47, Number 10; October 1983.
 Anonymous.  "Test: Nikon FM3A: The Nikon FM3A: Does the latest manual-focus Nikon SLR make the grade as an instant classic?"  pp 66–71.  Popular Photography, Volume 66 Number 3; March 2002.
 Anonymous.  "Test: Nikon 45 mm f/2.8P AF: A flat, snazzy lens for the Nikon FM3A that meters on all AF Nikons" p 71.  Popular Photography, Volume 66 Number 3; March 2002.
 Anonymous.  "70 Top 35 mm & Digital Cameras: Nikon FM3A" p 108.  Popular Photography, Volume 66 Number 12; December 2002
 Anonymous.  Nikon: Full Line Product Guide. Volume 8.  Melville, NY: Nikon Inc., 2002
 Comen, Paul.  Magic Lantern Guides: Nikon Classic Cameras; F, FE, FE2, FA and Nikkormat F series.  First Edition.  Magic Lantern Guides. Rochester, NY: Silver Pixel Press, 1996.  
 Keppler, Herbert.  "Review: Voigtländer Bessa R3A: Frogs Into Princes?  These rangefinders climb the royalty ladder." pp 58–59.  Popular Photography & Imaging, Volume 69 Number 5; May 2005.
 Peterson, B. Moose.  Magic Lantern Guides: Nikon Classic Cameras, Volume II; F2, FM, EM, FG, N2000 (F-301), N2020 (F-501), EL series.  First Edition.  Magic Lantern Guides.  Rochester, NY: Silver Pixel Press, 1996.  
 Schneider, Jason.  "Great Buys In Used SLRs!!"  pp 80–81, 130.  Popular Photography, Volume 61, Number 11; November 1997.
 Stafford, Simon and Rudi Hillebrand & Hans-Joachim Hauschild.  The New Nikon Compendium: Cameras, Lenses & Accessories since 1917.  2004 Updated North American Edition. Asheville, NC: Lark Books, 2003.

External links 

 Nikon FM3A
 Photography in Malaysia
 Nikon FM3A review

FM3A
FM3A
Cameras introduced in 2001